Oye is a town and headquarter of Oye Local Government Area in Ekiti State, Nigeria. Oye Local Government Area was carved out from the defunct Ekiti North Local Government on 17 May 1989.

Oye Local Government is bounded by Ilejemeje Local Government to the North, Irepodun/Ifelodun to the South, Ikole local Government to the East and Ido/Osi Local Government to the West.

It comprises the following towns and villages: Oye Ekiti, Ilupeju Ekiti, Ayegbaju Ekiti, Ire Ekiti, Itapa Ekiti, Osin Ekiti, Ayede Ekiti, Itaji Ekiti, Imojo Ekiti, Ilafon Ekiti, Isan Ekiti, Ilemeso Ekiti, Omu Ekiti, Ijelu Ekiti, Oloje Ekiti and a host of others.

There are no distinctive ethnic groups in the Local Government as a greater percentage of the people resident are of the Yoruba Language race. Nearly all the people speak Yoruba Language with negligible dialectical variations.

Local Government Areas in Ekiti State